The Reviewing Committee on the Export of Works of Art and Objects of Cultural Interest (RCEWA) is a committee of the United Kingdom government, advising the Department of Culture, Media and Sport (DCMS) on the export of cultural property. Some of its roles were shifted to the Museums, Libraries and Archives Council (MLA) in 2005 after the Goodison Report and the Arts Council England now provides the secretariat to the Committee. It is currently chaired by Sir Hayden Phillips, who was appointed on 17 March 2014 for a term of five years.

If an artwork is sold to a foreign buyer, it also advises the DCMS on whether to delay the granting of an export licence in order to allow time for a British buyer to raise funds to buy the work instead and keep it in the UK, if the committee decides the work is of high enough quality and has a sufficiently significant British connection - this is known as an export bar.

Waverley Criteria
The RCEWA was established in 1952, in accordance with the recommendations of the Waverley Committee, and assesses the objects before it against the three "Waverley Criteria":
 Is it closely connected with our history and national life? 
 Is it of outstanding aesthetic importance?
 Is it of outstanding significance for the study of some particular branch of art, learning or history?

The Committee designates an object as a "national treasure" if it considers that its departure 
from the UK would be a misfortune on one or more of the above three grounds,

Chair
 Lionel Robbins : 1952–1954.
 Lord Cottesloe: 1954–1972.
 Lord Perth : 1972–1976.
 John White : 1976–1982.
 Lord Plymouth : 1982–1985.
 Jonathan Scott : 1985–1995.
 Sir John Guinness : 1995–2003.
 Lord Inglewood : 2003–2013.
 Sir Hayden Phillips : 2014–2022.
 Andrew Hochhauser : 2022–

See also
 Values (heritage)
 Modern Rome – Campo Vaccino

References

External links

 

Department for Digital, Culture, Media and Sport
British art
Cultural organisations based in the United Kingdom
Cultural heritage of the United Kingdom
Non-departmental public bodies of the United Kingdom government